Šarkamen is a settlement situated in eastern Serbia, in the Negotin municipality of the Bor District. It is inhabited by 369 people, with a Serb majority (98,66%)

History

Roman
The town houses an archaeological site known as Vrelo Šarkamen, spanning an area of 25 hectares.
A Roman resident/memorial complex with a mausoleum on the slopes of Deli Jovan was built during the tetrarchy (early 4th century in Dacia Ripensis), of which today only ruins exist. The complex was discovered by Dragoslav Srejović. The mausoleum is dated to 293–311, and is dedicated to the mother of Emperor Maximinus Daia, who was born nearby. Notable imperial gold jewelry has been found, including a golden ring of the Emperor's mother.

References

Sources
B92
SANU

Timok Valley
Populated places established in the 3rd century